Robert Wrenn defeated the defending champion Fred Hovey in a rematch of the previous year's final, 7–5, 3–6, 6–0, 1–6, 6–1 to win the men's singles tennis title at the 1896 U.S. National Championships.

Future champions Malcolm Whitman, William Clothier and Holcombe Ward made their debuts at the tournament this year.

Draw

Challenge round

Finals

Earlier rounds

Section 1

Section 2

Section 3

Section 4

References 
 

Men's singles
1896